Kalyanasundareswarar Temple (கல்யாண சுந்தரேசுவரர் கோயில்) is a Hindu temple located at Thiruvelvikudi in the Kuthalam taluk of Mayiladuthurai district of Tamil Nadu, India. It is dedicated to Shiva.

Deity 

The presiding deity is Kalyanasundareswarar and the consort is Parimala Sugantha Nayaki.

Significance 

Hymns have been composed in praise of the temple by Sambandar and Sundarar in the Thevaram. Sundarar is believed to have bathed in the Agni theertham at this spot to cure himself. Thiruvelvikudi was also the place where Shiva granted half of his body to Parvathi making Thiruvelvikudi the birthplace of the Ardhanarisvara cult. The temple is counted as one of the temples built on the banks of River Kaveri.

References

External links

Gallery 

Shiva temples in Mayiladuthurai district
Padal Petra Stalam